The Torres Islands are an island chain in the Torba Province of the country of Vanuatu, and is that country’s the northernmost island group. The chain of islands that make up this micro-archipelago straddles the broader cultural boundary between Island Melanesia and several Polynesian outliers located in the neighbouring Solomon Islands. To the island chain’s north is Temotu Province of the Solomon Islands, to its south is Espiritu Santo, and to its southeast are the Banks Islands. To the west, beneath the ocean surface, is the deep Torres Trench, which is the subduction zone between the Australian and Pacific plates.

The seven islands in the Torres group, from north to south, are Hiw or Hiu (the largest), Metoma, Tegua, Ngwel (an uninhabited islet), Linua, Lo or Loh, and Toga. The island  chain stretches across . These islands are less rugged than the other islands of Vanuatu that lie further to the south. Contrary to popular belief, only a few stretches of the Torres Islands' coastlines are graced with white sand beaches; in reality, their shores are mostly made of rocky coral uplift.

As of mid-2004, the Torres Islands had a total population of approximately 950 people, dispersed across at least ten settlements of various sizes, all located on or near coastal areas. The names of these settlements are: Yögevigemëne (or Yögemëne for short), Tinemēvönyö, Yawe and Yakwane (on Hiw), Lotew (on Tegua; sometimes misspelled Lateu), Lungharegi, Telakwlakw and Rinuhe (on Lo), and Likwal and Litew (on Toga). A small airstrip on Linua, opened in 1983, provides the only regular transportation link between the Torres Islands and the rest of Vanuatu. Lungharegi is the administrative centre for the Torres Islands, but its governance role is minimal. It has a community phone and medical clinic, but no bank or police station, and only two sparsely stocked stores.

Name 
The name “Torres” was bestowed on the islands by European cartographers, in remembrance of the sixteenth-century navigator Luis Vaz de Torres, who had briefly visited the islands of North and Central Vanuatu in April, May and June 1606, as part of a Spanish expedition across the Pacific, from South America to Terra Australis. The navigator's name was also bestowed on the important Torres Strait, which separates mainland Australia from the island of New Guinea. Ironically, Torres never saw, or even heard about, the Torres Islands. However, his commander, the Portuguese captain Fernandes de Queirós, serving the Spanish Crown, did sail near the Torres Islands at one point in search of the Santa Cruz Islands. 

Long before Europeans arrived, the indigenous inhabitants and neighbors of these islands had called them by various other names, the most important of which was Vava  (modern Vave ). However, after the name “Torres” began appearing on maps, that name eventually stuck, and the islands have now been widely known by that name for almost two hundred years. Today, even the inhabitants of the islands use that name, and only the oldest among them recall the name Vave. They now designate their group of islands as ‘Torres’, and in general are indifferent to (or unaware of) the origin story of the name.

History 

The meagre archaeological data suggests that the Torres Islands were first populated around 3200 years ago. There is abundant archaeological and oral-history evidence that, before European contact, the pattern of settlements in the Torres Islands was quite different from pattern prevalent in the coastal villages of today. It appears that, back then, most villages and extended family areas (called nakamals, or ‘gemël’) were located on higher ground, away from the shore, and were inhabited by fewer people. Thus, the islands were probably dotted with small clearings, in the middle of which were a handful of households and public spaces.

Although several European explorers reached the islands in the 19th century, in the early 1880s the islanders were quickly drawn into the sphere of influence of the Melanesian Mission, which pressed the Torres inhabitants to concentrate in coastal settlements more accessible and controllable by missionaries. Around this time, a Torres islander, known today by his Christianised name of Adams Tuwia, was transferred to the Mission's headquarters on Norfolk Island, where he eventually became ordained a priest. However, the first Melanesian ever to be ordained as a Christian priest was George Sarawia, from the neighbouring Banks Islands. Because the Anglicans had set up their regional centre of operations in the Banks Islands, the mission's leadership decided to adopt the language of Mota Island (in the Banks island group) as the language of choice for translating and transmitting Christian teachings across the whole region comprising they Banks, Torres and Temotu island groups. As a result, according to local accounts, the Mota language continued to be taught in the Torres mission school until the early 1970s, and it is still possible to find elder Torres Islanders who are partly fluent in Mota.

Notwithstanding the existence of a mission in the Torres Islands in the late nineteenth century, a non-local missionary only came to reside in those islands for an extended period in the first decade of the 20th century. This was the Rev. Walter John Durrad, who lived on Tegua and then moved to Lo between 1905 and 1910. 

The first permanent mission station and church-house of the Torres Islands was originally established by Durrad on the south coast of Tegua, but was eventually moved to Vipaka, on the south west side of Lo, following an apparent rumour of incestuous behaviour by the high chief of Tegua, whose sin was judged to be too abhorrent for the sensitivity of the Mission's leadership. More importantly, during this time - between the second half of the nineteenth century and the first half of the twentieth - the population of the Torres Islands suffered catastrophic decline as a combined result of the various epidemic diseases that were introduced by Europeans and the accelerated out-migration provoked by Blackbirding. According to vaguely worded Mission records located at the Diocese of Banks and Torres headquarters on Sola (Vanua Lava), at some time in the early 1930s the total population of the Torres group numbered no more than 56 persons. Hence, the subsequent recovery of the indigenous population of these islands, along with the continuity of linguistic and cultural values that they still exhibit, can be described as nothing less than remarkable. Despite the fact that they belonged to a broader regional complex of human and material exchanges that extended well into present-day Temotu province (in the Solomons), the Torres Islands eventually became part of the Anglo-French Condominium of the New Hebrides in 1906, and were subsequently incorporated into the Republic of Vanuatu in 1980.

Ecology 
Like the rest of the country, the islands are in the Vanuatu rain forests ecoregion. The coconut crab (Birgus latro) is one of its most famous species. However, since the opening of the airstrip at Linua these animals became the single most important cash crop in the Torres group. To date, the sale of Birgus has been directly governed by the fluctuating demand of the tourist market in faraway Port Vila and, to a lesser degree, the provincial township of Luganville. Predictably, the high demand for crab resulted in a gradual but incremental decline in the Birgus population across North Vanuatu, and led to a visible depletion of this creature's numbers in the Torres group. Consequently, various concerned individuals and groups successfully pressured the local provincial government of SanMa (the province in which Luganville is located) to declare a temporary ban on the sale, purchase or consumption of crab in that province. This ban first took effect in the first semestre of 2004 and is intended to be lifted sometime in early 2008. In the meantime, exports of crab from the Banks and Torres Islands (i.e. TorBa Province) to Port Vila is regulated through a relatively inefficient scheme of "open" and "closed" seasons and intra-regional quotas.

Languages 
Two closely related yet distinct languages are spoken in the Torres group: Hiw and Lo-Toga. Hiw is spoken by the population (about 280 people) of the sole island of Hiw. Lo-Toga is spoken on the southern parts of the Torres, essentially on the islands of Lo and Toga (about 580 people); it consists of two very close dialect varieties, Lo and Toga (note that Toga is sometimes used as a cover term for the two dialects). There is no mutual intelligibility between Hiw and Lo-Toga, but many Hiw speakers are bilingual.

Hiw and (Lo-)Toga belong to the East Vanuatu languages, a subgroup of the Oceanic family. As is the case for most unwritten languages of Vanuatu, no detailed description has ever been published yet on them. In 2004 the linguist Alexandre François undertook the first descriptive study of these two languages, which is currently in progress.

Culture 
The islanders divide themselves ethnically into essentially two groups, matching their linguistic division. 
The cultural differences existing within the Torres Is., at least in the perception of the islanders, essentially match language boundaries: that is, two groups are recognised — the 'people of Hiw' vs the 'people of Toga'; however, a secondary, less essential division is drawn between the two populations of Lo and Toga.
The islanders were first described in very general - and not always accurate - ethnographic terms by W. J. Durrad at the beginning of the twentieth century (fragments of Durrad's notes were eventually published in the 1940s), and have been the bailiwick of the anthropologist Carlos Mondragón since 1999.

Today the inhabitants of the Torres Islands continue to follow to the same general patterns of subsistence agriculture and supplementary fishing activities that their ancestors did. In addition, key aspects of their ancestral knowledge and ritual cycles are still generally extant. These are dominated by two male-centred institutions, known as the hukwe (which is the equivalent of the suqe in the Banks Islands) and the lēh-temēt. The hukwe constitutes the local complex of status-alteration rituals by which men are able to acquire greater status and power, while the lēh-temēt is the name given to a smaller group of men who have been initiated into specific types of ritual knowledge that are directly relevant to the manipulation of mana (generative potency or power) and, more specifically, to the relationship between the living and the dead. The most impressive and visible aspect of the activities of the initiates of the lēh-temēt are the manufacture and use of ritual headdresses known as temēt (primordial spirits) during special singing and dancing ceremonial rituals. In fact, the headdresses are known as temēt because they are considered to BE the temporary physical manifestations of temēt; hence, the use of headdresses is considered to be an extremely delicate operation, during which the possibility of spiritual pollution has to be closely monitored and controlled. It is partly for this reason that the headdresses are always destroyed immediately at the end of the ceremony. Notwithstanding the continuity of certain core customary practices, many important and profound changes have transformed the lives and worldviews of these people as a result of more than a century of contacts and interpenetration by the Anglican church, colonial administrators and traders, and, most recently, the postcolonial influence of the nation-state and the international world market - whose greatest direct manifestation is in the form of cash, independent travellers, sailing ships and luxury cruise liners which visit this island group every so often.

References

External links 
 Tourism in the Torres Islands, including map
 The traditional calendar of the islanders
 Detailed list and map of the north Vanuatu languages
 International Herald Tribune article on sea level rise debate
  Carlos Mondragón's webpage with data and images of the Torres Islands, and useful links

Islands of Vanuatu
Archipelagoes of the Pacific Ocean
Torba Province